Hemusite is a very rare isometric gray mineral containing copper, molybdenum, sulfur, and tin with chemical formula Cu6SnMoS8. It was discovered by Bulgarian mineralogist Georgi Terziev in 1963. He also described it and named it after Haemus,  the ancient name of Stara planina (Balkan) mountains in Europe.  The type locality is Chelopech copper ore deposit, Bulgaria. Later tiny deposits of hemusite were found in Ozernovskoe deposit, Kamchatka, Russia; Kawazu mine, Rendaiji, Shimoda city, Chūbu region, Honshu Island, Japan; Iriki mine, Iriki, Satsuma-gun, Kagoshima Prefecture, Kyushu Region, Japan; Kochbulak deposit, Tashkent, Uzbekistan. Hemusite occurs as rounded isometric grains and aggregates usually about 0.05 mm in diameter and in association with enargite, luzonite, colusite, stannoidite, renierite, tennantite, chalcopyrite, pyrite, and other minerals.

See also

 List of minerals recognized by the International Mineralogical Association

References

Further reading

Sulfosalt minerals
Copper minerals
Tin minerals
Molybdenum minerals
Cubic minerals
Minerals in space group 207
Minerals in space group 216
Minerals in space group 225